2011 Czech Lion Awards ceremony was held on 4 March 2012.

Winners and nominees

Non-statutory Awards

References

2011 film awards
Czech Lion Awards ceremonies